Benny Chan Ho-man (born 7 October 1969) is a Hong Kong actor and singer.

Education
Chan attended . He graduated with a bachelor's degree in social science from Lingnan University.

Acting career
Chan's career in the entertainment industry began in 1994 when he appeared in a television commercial for Vitasoy. He later joined TVB and acted in many television dramas produced by the company. Some of his best-known roles include Duen Yu in Demi-Gods and Semi-Devils (1997), the Monkey King in Journey to the West II (1998), and Na-tsa in Gods of Honour (2001).

Since the early 2000s, Chan has become less active in Hong Kong, and has switched to working on mainland Chinese and Taiwanese television series. One of which is a series drama, The Holy Monk, as the main character, Holy Monk. The drama became popular in various countries.

Music career
Apart from being an actor, Chan is also a singer, and has released a number of albums. His best-known song is the theme song of Journey to the West II (1998). He also sang the theme songs for Dragon Love (1999), Gods of Honour (2001), Silver Mouse (2002), Qianlong Xia Jiangnan (2003) and A Pillow Case of Mystery (2006) and the subthemes for Journey to the West II, Anti-Crime Squad (1999), Silver Mouse, Vigilante Force (2003) and Qianlong Xia Jiangnan. His rendition of Chinese versions of two Pokémon songs has won him several awards.

Personal life
In 2011 Chan married Lisa Jiang Lisha (蒋丽莎), a mainland Chinese model from Hunan. Their daughter Ya Ru Chan (陳雅薷) was born on 30 November 2011.

Filmography

Film
 Love and the City (1995)
 Made in Heaven (1996)
 Last Ghost Standing (1999)
 The Final Winner (2001)
 Salon Beauty (2002)
 Love is a Butterfly (2002)
 Tai Ji Soldier (2005)
 Tragic Hero (2008)
 Iceman (2014)
 Kung Fu Boys (2016)
 Funny Soccer (2016)
 Through the Eye (2017)
 Winning Buddha (2017)
 Monster Hunt Bao Man (2017)
 Monster Hunt Bao Man 2 (2018)
 The Incredible Monk (2018)
 Million Demons City (2018)
 The Incredible Monk - Dragon Return (2018)
 Crazy Dragon (2018)
 Fake Partner (2018)
 She's a Man. He's a Woman (2019)
 Deception of the Novelist (2019)
 Kaifeng Demon (2019)
 Flirting Scholar from the Future (2019)
 Monkey King - The Volcano (2019)
 The Incredible Monk 3 (2019)
 My Kickass Wife (2019)
 Zhong Kui (2019)
 Star Master (2019)
 Master Dragon (2019)
 The Sword Legend (2019)
 Jiang Ziya (2019)
 Dragon Hunter 1 (2020)
 Monkey King (2020)
 God Erlang (2020)
 God Erlang 2 (2020)

Television
 Demi-Gods and Semi-Devils (1997)
 Dark Tales II (1998)
 Journey to the West II (1998)
 Anti-Crime Squad (1999)
 Dragon Love (1999)
 Zhuang Ya Princess (1999)
 Reaching Out (2000)
 Gods of Honour (2001)
 Silver Mouse (2002)
 Whatever It Takes (2002)
 Network Love Story (2002)
 Vigilante Force (2003)
 Qianlong Xia Jiangnan (2003)
 Carry Me Fly and Walk Off (2003)
 Love Never Dies (2003)
 Deadful Melody (2004)
 The Undercover Swordsman (2004)
 Hi-Fly (2004)
 Yan Hua San Yue (2005)
 A Pillow Case of Mystery (2006)
 The Biter Bitten (2006)
 Da Qing Hou Gong (2006)
 Love Machine (2006)
 A Change of Destiny (2007)
 Liao Zhai 2 (2007)
 Chocolate Lovers (2007)
 The Legend of Chu Liuxiang (2007)
 Justice Bao (2008)
 Legend of the Demigods (2008)
 Duo Qing Nu Ren Chi Qing Nan (2008)
 Justice Bao (2010) as Bai Yutang
 The Legend of Crazy Monk (2010)
 Love of Seven Fairy Maidens (2010)
 The Legend of Chinese Zodiac (2011)
 Da Tang Nü Xun An (2011)
 The Legend of Crazy Monk 2 (2011)
 Love Amongst War (2012)
 The Legend of Xishi (2012)
 The Legend of Crazy Monk 3 (2012)
 A Happy Life (2013)
 New Mad-Monk (2014)
 A Happy Life 2 (2016)
 The Story of Liu Hai and Jinchan (2016)
 The Legend of Beggar King and Big Foot Queen (2016)
 Deadful Melody (2018)

References

External links
 Benny Chan's official Myspace page
  Benny Chan's official blog

1969 births
Living people
Alumni of Lingnan University (Hong Kong)
Hong Kong artists
Hong Kong expatriates in China
Hong Kong male film actors
Hong Kong Mandopop singers
Hong Kong male singers
Hong Kong male television actors
Hong Kong television presenters
TVB actors
20th-century Hong Kong male actors
21st-century Hong Kong male actors